The Tagula shrikethrush (Colluricincla discolor) is a species of bird in the family Pachycephalidae.

Taxonomy and systematics
This species was formerly considered a conspecific member of the little shrikethrush complex. Genetic investigations of New Guinea populations of the little shrikethrush indicate high levels of genetic divergence, suggesting it comprised more than one species.

Distribution and habitat
It is found on Tagula Island in New Guinea. Its natural habitats are subtropical or tropical moist lowland forests and subtropical or tropical moist montane forests.

References

Tagula shrikethrush
Birds of New Guinea
Tagula shrikethrush
Tagula shrikethrush